Angélica Ksyvickis (born 30 November 1973), known professionally by the mononym Angélica, is a Brazilian television host, actress, and former singer.

Career 
She started her career at 4, when she won a contest to choose Brazil's most beautiful child at a popular variety show presented by Chacrinha. At 13, she became famous for replacing Xuxa as the presenter of the kids show Clube da Criança (en:Kid's Club). Her popularity exploded when her hit single Vou de táxi ("I go by taxi", a remake of Joe le taxi, by French singer Vanessa Paradis) topped the Brazilian charts. Vou de táxi becoming a big hit has since become a classic, and is remembered by most of the Brazilian population, even though more than 20 years have lapsed since its release. Likewise, in 1991, her new album named "Angelica" increased her popularity with the song "Sweet cotton and Guarana". She also starred on the popular mini-series The Guarani.

Angélica has sold over 13 million copies of albums in which 13 of them were released between 1988 and 2001.

In 1993, she joined the second most popular channel in Brazil, SBT presenting the kids variety show "Casa da Angelica", which was a big hit. More popular than ever she also presented the popular teen game show "Passa ou Repassa" and " TV Animal".

In 1996 she signed a 7 years contract with  Rede Globo to present her own show, Angélica (mostly known as Angel Mix, every weekday mornings, which was followed by "Caça Talentos", a soap opera starring her as Fada Bela. The ratings were robust, making Angélica even more famous than Xuxa; this was the first time any TV hostess had surpassed her in popularity. Sales of her merchandising and CDs were also huge.

But soon, after the initial boom, the ratings began to decline and she changed the format of the show several times. While in 1996 Angélica was unbeatable among kids, in 1997 she lost popularity to Chiquititas (that year, Angelica's album sold 300,000 copies vs. 800,000 copies by the Chiquititas cast), but she was still very popular until 1999. In 1998, she had 250 products linked to her name and made more money than Xuxa due to licensing (the Angélica shoes by Grendene sold over 1 million pairs in 5 months; in the same period her cereal sold over 7 million boxes and her nail polish sold 4 million). The success of her products was even more remarkable because unlike Eliana (3rd on the list) and Gugu Liberato (4th), she didn't promote her product-line during her show.

Finally, she decided to end her career as a child show hostess and, with only three months left for her contract with Globo to expire, she was chosen as the presenter for Video Game (game for teenagers), a five-minute segment on Vídeo Show. Video Game was a game-show whereby two celebrities would compete head-on throughout the entire week. The segment caused Video Show's ratings to double, and what was supposed to be a 2001 summer-only, 5 minute segment, became a 20-minute block (half of the show); it is still aired and has managed to  keep up its impressive ratings.

Due to the success of Vídeo Show, Angelica's popularity heightened again, leading to her being in a lot of advertising campaigns and appearing on magazine covers. She also presented the first two seasons of Fame, Brazilian version of Operación Triunfo (Operation Triumph).

Since her well-received return to TV, presenting Vídeo Show, Rede Globo began planning projects for her, but her own show finally started in April 2006. "Estrelas" is a show where Angélica interviews stars and shows their intimacy (house, hobbies, etc.). The show is #1 in its time-slot in the states which show the program and airs every Saturday before TV Xuxa.

Acting career
Angélica had her first acting role on the successful mini-series, "The Guarani" at Rede Manchete. During the late 1980s and early 1990s, she had roles in several Os Trapalhões movies .

In 1996 she starred in the kids drama show Caça Talentos, which aired daily after "Angel Mix". While the show was a big hit for three years when the show was declinated it was replaced by Bambuluá, where she played a super-hero, which flopped.

She returned to acting in 1998; she had a starring role in Simão, o Fantasma Trapalhão, with Renato Aragão, only the best receivied by the public.

At the end of 1998, at the peak of her popularity, she starred in a special and highly promoted live special popular sitcom Sai de Baixo  and in 2001 she had a recurring role on soap opera Um Anjo Caiu do Céu, where she played an angel: Angelina.

In 2004, Angélica was again one of the biggest TV presenters in Brazil thanks to "Vídeo Game" and Globo decided to release another movie with her in the leading role, but the teen-oriented movie, Um Show de Verão (which she starred in with Luciano Huck) didn't achieve expected success, in part due to it being rated PG-14.

In 2010, Angélica and Luciano Huck were one of the casts of a drama miniseries, As Cariocas However, the last episode featuring them proved to be the most watched episode in Brazil.

Since 2001, until 2011, she made "Video Game". The "Video Game" was stopped, with ten years.

Since 2006, she presented Estrelas, a TV program of interviewing celebrities, until 2018.

Personal life
Angélica was born in Santo André, the daughter of Francisco and Angelina Ksyvickis. She has one sister, businesswoman (artistic producer) Márcia Marbá. She is of Italian, Portuguese, Polish, Austrian, Russian, Croatian, Lithuanian, Romanian, and Ukrainian descent. According to research done her ancestors emigrated from Naples to Juiz de Fora. She also has Native Brazilian ancestry, of the Piquerobi ethnicity.

Discography

Filmography

Films

Dubbing

References

External links

 
 Official website (in Portuguese)

1973 births
Living people
Actresses from Santo André
Brazilian people of Lithuanian descent
Brazilian people of Polish descent
Brazilian people of Ukrainian descent
Brazilian people of Russian descent
Brazilian people of Romanian descent
Brazilian people of Bulgarian descent
Brazilian people of Austrian descent
Brazilian people of Italian descent
Brazilian people of Portuguese descent
Brazilian people of Croatian descent
Brazilian people of indigenous peoples descent
Brazilian television presenters
Brazilian film actresses
Brazilian television actresses
Brazilian children's television presenters
People from Santo André, São Paulo
21st-century Brazilian singers
21st-century Brazilian women singers
Brazilian women television presenters